Roman Maksimovich Miroshnichenko (born June 4, 1977) is a Ukraine-born Russian jazz fusion guitarist, composer, and record producer. He has received numerous accolades, including four The Independent Music Awards, 1st Prize of the USA Songwriting Competition, 1st Prize of the International Acoustic Music Awards, Gold medal of the Global Music Awards and four Hollywood Music in Media Awards nominees. He has worked with musicians such as Steve Vai, Al Di Meola, Marco Mendoza, Paul Wertico, Jennifer Batten, Heather Headley, Djivan Gasparyan, Dominique DiPiazza during his career. In 2008 - 2017 he toured regularly in a duo with fusion guitarist Larry Coryell.

Career

Early life
Roman Miroshnichenko was born on June 4, 1977, in Dniprodzerzhynsk, Ukrainian SSR, USSR. On the maternal ancestors line comes from Terek Cossacks with Baltic and Swedish roots. His father, Maxim Miroshnichenko, is an arranger, band leader and saxophone/clarinet player. Roman Miroshnichenko started playing guitar in his early teens. He was a member of his father's big band from 1994 to 1999. He studied engineering at Dnipro National University of Rail Transport, and then studied jazz guitar at the Moscow State Art and Cultural University. Roman Miroshnichenko was heavily influenced by John McLaughlin, Paco De Lucia, Larry Coryell and Al Di Meola.

2000s
In 2002, Roman Miroshnichenko founded his own band, RMProject, and has been touring in Russia, Europe, Asia, and the United States.

In 2009, Roman Miroshnicheko has released his solo album "Temptation", featuring 2-time Latin Grammy winner Daniel Figueiredo, Frank Colon, ex-sax player for Manfred Mann Chapter Three Clive Stevens, and Henrik Andersen, among others. The album's single "Unforgiven"  won both the standard and People's Choice popular-vote judging at the 9th Annual Independent Music Awards, in the song category "World Traditional."

2010s
In 2010 the album "Temptation" itself was nominated at the 10th Annual Independent Music Awards, in the category "World Beat."

In June 2011, Roman Miroshnichenko rocked 250,000 attendees at the main stage of The Creation of Peace festival was headlined by John Fogerty, Public Image Ltd and Gogol Bordello.

In 2012 he toured in jazz trio with Latin Grammy-nominated Argentinian drummer Daniel “Pipi” Piazzolla, the grandson of Astor Piazzolla, and the ex-bass guitarist for John McLaughlin Trio - Dominique Di Piazza.

In 2013, Roman Miroshnichenko has released his next one album, titled "Surreal", produced together with Daniel Figueiredo and featuring Larry Coryell, Dominique Di Piazza, Mario Olivares, Josquin des Pres and Argentinian pianist Mario Parmisano. The album's single "Desperation" recorded in duo with Parmisano won 1st prize at the 18th Annual USA Songwriting Competition.

In April 2013, Hal Leonard Books (one of the biggest US publishing houses) released “The  Great  Jazz  Guitarists” encyclopedia by Scott Yanow, the most comprehensive guide to jazz guitarists ever published (from Django Reinhardt to Les Paul, Jeff Beck and beyond) with information about Roman Miroshnichenko.

In 2014, Steve Vai with Roman Miroshnichenko's rock-band and the 80-piece Russian Philharmonic performed in Russia. Next year, double disc DVD “Stillness in Motion: Vai Live in L.A.Stillness In Motion" was released with a bonus disc premiering “The Space Between the Notes", a revelatory video diary consisting of more than three and a half hours of footage, lensed around the world on-stage, off-stage and behind-the-scenes, rehearsal and the show moments of Steve's joint performance with Roman Miroshnichenko and orchestra during Vai’s "Story of Light" World Tour.

In 2015 "War & Peace", The Opera was presented at the World Of Guitar Festival in Russia. It was written by Larry Coryell, featuring The Russian Philharmonic Orchestra with the Roman Miroshnichenko jazz trio and the Slovenian Academy of Music (Ljubljana) vocal octet.

In April 2016, Roman Miroshnichenko formed the World of Guitar Trio with Henrik Andersen and José Antonio Rodríguez. Their album Perfect Strangers won the "Best Instrumental Album" award at the 15th Annual Independent Music Awards. "Moon over Tanjore," a song from the album, won the award for Best World Traditional Song, while Miroshnichenko's "Alien's Dream" was nominated for Best Instrumental Song.

In May 2016, The Guinness Record of the Thanks Jimi Festival, held in Wroclaw, was supported by Al Di Meola, Scott Henderson, British band Status Quo, Roman Miroshnichenko and Polish musicians.

In late 2016, Roman Miroshnichenko joined the judging panel of the 16th Annual Independent Music Awards program, along with Tom Waits, Slayer, Sepultura, and others.

Since 2017, Roman Miroshnichenko is a CEO of the annual 'World of Guitar' festival international, held in Kaluga, Russia. In May 2017, at the festival's opening, Larry Coryell's last opera, based on Leo Tolstoy's novel Anna Karenina, was presented, featuring the Moscow Symphony along with Miroshnichenko, Serbian classical guitarist Nenad Stephanovich, and Slovenian opera soloists. The world premiere was dedicated to Coryell, the "godfather of fusion," who died in New York in February of that year. The opera was completed by Miroshnichenko and Stephanovich after the death of Coryell.

In April 2017, Roman Miroshnichenko joined The Trip Show project together with bass player Julie Slick (Adrian Belew Power Trio), the drummer Morgan Ågren (Steve Vai, Glenn Hughes, Tony Iommi, Frank Zappa) and Canadian vocalist Matt Laurent.

In October 2017, Roman Miroshnichenko released a new album, "Ascension", featuring Grammy-winning violinist Charlie Bisharat, Mario Parmisano, renown United States musicians percussionist Luis Alicea and keyboardist Aron Ferrer, Danish virtuoso guitarist Henrik Andersen, and world-class percussionist Gumbi Ortiz. The album has earned a nomination in the “Best Instrumental Album” category at the 16th Annual Independent Music Awards. Two compositions from "Ascension" made Finalists of The UK Songwriting Contest and USA Songwriting Competition as well.

In 2018 he toured with the ex-guitarist for Michael Jackson - band member of all three of his world tours - Jennifer Batten. In late 2018, Roman Miroshnichenko joined the judging panel of the 17th Annual Independent Music Awards program, along with Tom Waits, Robert Smith, Paquito D'Rivera, Lee Ann Womack, Todd Rundgren, and others.

In late 2018 Roman recorded flamenco-guitar parts for Frank Colon's album Latin Lounge. Take Effect magazine editor commented on the release: "Certainly one of the most accomplished records in the area of Latin Jazz in recent history, Colon and company blend diverse musical backgrounds here seamlessly."

In 2019 Roman was one of the presenters of the 17th Annual IMA ceremony at the Symphony Space Performing Arts Center in New York City. Also this year he toured with: jazz drummer Paul Wertico, who gained recognition as a member of the Pat Metheny Group, the ex-bass guitarist for John McLaughlin Trio - Dominique Di Piazza and with Marco Mendoza trio (as special guest) - ex-bass guitarist for Whitesnake and Thin Lizzy.

2020–present
In 2020, once again, Roman Miroshnichenko joined the judging panel of the 18th Annual Independent Music Awards program, along with Tom Waits, Robert Smith, Joe Satriani, Ziggy Marley, The Cardigans, Mick Ralphs, Roberta Flack, John Petrucci, Carl Palmer, Gloria Gaynor and others.

In February 2020, Roman Miroshnichenko won 1st prize at the 16th Annual International Acoustic Music Awards.

In April 2020, Roman has collaborated on a project "We Are One" by Pakistani music producer Kashan Admani, featuring Simon Philips, Stu Hamm, Charlie Bisharat, Palash Sen, Matt Laurent, Gumbi Ortiz. In May 2020 he has composed and produced the single "IsoBoogie" featuring 'guitar Queen' Jennifer Batten.

In October 2020, Roman Miroshnichenko released a new album, "The Sixth Sense", featuring world renown special guests: Jennifer Batten, Charlie Bisharat, Bunny Brunel, Paul Wertico, Gary Husband, Dominique DiPiazza, Frank Colon, Gumbi Ortiz, Matt Laurent. Album's composition "Bodhrán's Magic" received a nomination for the Hollywood Music in Media Awards, becoming one of the number of such nominees as Hans Zimmer, Alan Silvestri, Howard Shore, Branford Marsalis, Terence Blanchard and others. Whole album "The Sixth Sense" has won the Silver medal of the Global Music Awards in the "Best Album" category. By December 2020, "The Sixth Sense" special CD's edition had earned a Japanese distribution. Scott Yanow commented on the release: "When one listens to the powerful guitar playing of Roman Miroschnichenko, it is easy to be reminded of Al DiMeola and John McLaughlin during his Mahavishnu days, but it soon becomes apparent that Miroschnichenko has his own sound within fusion, setting the standard for XXI century fusion guitar. While he is never shy to cut loose, he also uses subtlety, mood variations and creativity throughout, mixing together tight arrangements with pure spontaneity. The Sixth Sense is an impressive effort that can be a prized acquisition for the guitarist’s many fans."

In May 2021, Roman Miroshnichenko included to the Grand Jury judging panel of the LIT Talent Awards.

In July 2021, Roman Miroshnichenko released joint album with Henrik Andersen, "New Shapes", featuring world renown special guests: Trilok Gurtu, Bickram Ghosh, Charlie Bisharat, Frank Colon and Gumbi Ortiz. Album's compositions "Flying Dragon" and "Corona Funk" received a nominations in "Instrumental" and "Jazz" categories for the Hollywood Music in Media Awards. Сomposition “New Shapes” received Honorable Mention prize in "Instrumental" category for the 20th Annual International Songwriting Competition. Whole album won Silver medal of the Global Music Awards in the "Best World Fusion Album" category.

In late October 2021, Roman Miroshnichenko released joint album  "Plays Daniel Figueiredo", featuring the 25-piece St. Petersburg Studio Orchestra and Brazilian pianist Rannieri Oliveira. The album included ten tracks, composed by 2-time Latin Grammy Winner Daniel Figueiredo and was released by leading Brazilian label MJC Music. "Plays Daniel Figueiredo" has won two Silver medals of the Global Music Awards in the "Best Album" and "Instrumental" categories. Album's composition "Pianino" received a nomination in "Instrumental" categorie for the Hollywood Music in Media Awards.

In May 2022, on eve Roman's 45th Jubilee "Viva La Rock", joint project, featuring Marco Mendoza, Mario Parmisano and the 80-piece Russian Philharmonic Orchestra was presented during fall tour. In June 2022 Roman Miroshnichenko became a voting member of The Recording Academy. In December 2022, Roman's anthology "My Best Songs" has won Gold medal of the Global Music Awards in the "Best Instrumental Album" category.

Equipment
Roman Miroshnichenko owns custom guitars made for him by Paul Reed Smith, Abraham Wechter, Gibson and Ovation Guitar Company.

Awards and honors

Discography (selected)

As leader
 The Infinity (2005)
 Temptation (2009)
 Quasipsychedelic, (2011)
 Surreal (2013)
 Ascension (2017)
 The Sixth Sense (2020)

Joint albums
 Together (2007)
 Perfect Strangers, World of Guitar Trio (2015)
 New Shapes, Roman Miroshnichenko and Henrik Andersen (2021)
 Plays Daniel Figueiredo, Roman Miroshnichenko and St.Petersburg Studio Orchestra (2021)

Compilation albums
 Instrumental Collection. Best Russia's guitarists. (JRC, 2002)
 The Best Of. GuitaROMANtic. Roman Miroshnichenko (Gazprom expo, 2012)
 New Music Now. Vol.11. The Winners of the 18th USA Songwriting competition (2014)
 Pan Global Electro Lounge. Vol.2. Feat.: John Abercrombie, Ralph Towner, Roman Miroshnichenko, Clive Stevens, Michael Carvin, Dave Johnson, Raúl Ramirez, Roy Venkataraman. (PLANET 8 RECORDS, 2014)
 Now Hear This! Various Artists. The Winners of The 15th Independent Music Awards. (2016)
 Anthology. Top 10 Songs Of 10 Years. Roman Miroshnichenko (2019)
 New Acoustic Music (2020). CD featuring the current winners of the 16th International Acoustic Music Awards: Jason Mraz, Roman Miroshnichenko, Ellis Paul Music and More, and others..
 Anthology. My Best Songs. Roman Miroshnichenko (2022)

As special guest
 Poetic: Jazz Theater. Gariman Volnov. Feat.: Marco Mendoza, Larry Coryell, Joel Taylor, Mario Parmisano, Joey Heredia, Renato Neto (2012)
 One Eye On the Highway. Elizabeth MacInnis (2013)
 Bridges: A Musical Journey. Igor Ledermann (2014)
 Radio Nostalgia II. Mario Olivares (2016)
 Latin Lounge. Frank Colon (2019)

Singles
 Xekere, feat.: Roman Miroshnichenko, Clive Stevens, Greg Minnick, Michael Grossman, Frank Colón and Daniel Figueiredo. (2009).
 Penultimate, Roman Miroshnichenko & Larry Coryell (2012).
 We Are One, by Kashan Admani, feat. Simon Philips, Stu Hamm, Charlie Bisharat, Roman Miroshnichenko, Palash Sen, Matt Laurent (2020).
 IsoBoogie, Roman Miroshnichenko & Jennifer Batten (2020).
 Love Can, Barbara & Paul Wertico, feat. Laurie Akers, Roman Miroshnichenko (2020).
 El Encuentro, René Tornero G., feat. Roman Miroshnichenko (2021)
 Fusion Holidays, CAB by Bunny Brunel, featuring Roman Miroshnichenko with Virgil Donati, Mahesh Balasooriya and Kaylene Peoples. (2022).
 Fusion Raga by Stas Namin, feat.: Roman Miroshnichenko, Charlie Bisharat, Gumbi Ortiz, Frank Colón, Henrik Andersen (2023).

As sideman
 Stillness in Motion - The Space Between The Notes. Steve Vai, DVD (SME, 2015)

Other
 All Your Life. Al Di Meola. CD cover photographer credits. (Veliene, 2013)

Charts

Filmography
 2004 – «Kamenskaya III». TV–series. Guitar tracks recording
 2005 – «Tourists». TV–series. Guitar tracks recording
 2007 – «Russian Game». Film. Guitar tracks recording
 2007 – «Live in Jazz Town», DVD. RMProject's live show
 2008 – «Two sisters». TV-series. As episode's actor
 2008 – «Neproshchennye». Directed by Klim Shipenko. Soundtrack's co–author, guitar tracks recording
 2010 – «Orange Juice». Film. As episode's actor.
 2010 – «Ribeirao do tempo». Brazilian soap opera. Guitar tracks recording
 2010 – «Tides to and From». Animated short film by Ivan Maksimov. Guitar tracks recording. The official participant of the Generation Kplus Programme at the 61st Berlinale Film Festival Competition, San Gio Verona Video Festival 2011 winner ("Best animatied film"), Eksjö Animation Festival 2011 winner, XVIII International Festival Competition of animation films Krok special prize winner, 2011.
 2011 – «Canto de Pilon». Music video
 2013 – «Music teacher dreams». Feat. Dominic Miller, Tony Levin, Juan Manuel Canizares, Daniel Piazzolla, Dominique Di Piazza, Roman Miroshnichenko, Adrian Belew.
 2018 – «Alien's Electrik Dream». Music video
 2020 – «We Are One». Music video
 2021 – «Russian Mountains». Music video
 2021 – «Trick». Animated short film. As composer.

Bibliography
 The Great Jazz Guitarists: The Ultimate Guide (April 2013)

References

External links
 Official website

1977 births
Living people
Jazz fusion guitarists
Jazz-rock guitarists
Lead guitarists
Independent Music Awards winners
Ukrainian jazz guitarists
Ukrainian jazz musicians
Russian jazz guitarists
Russian jazz musicians
21st-century guitarists
Recipients of the Medal of the Order "For Merit to the Fatherland"